Chou Chun-hsun (Taiwanese POJ:  Chiu Chùn-hun; born February 23, 1980) is a Go player.

Biography
Chou was born in Taipei, Taiwan. During the 1980s and 1990s, professional Go was not a very established game in Taiwan and did not present many opportunities for its players, but unlike many other professional Taiwanese players who relocated to Japan to further their careers, Chou decided that he would compete solely in Taiwan. Chou became a professional in 1993. He would later achieve a 7 dan ranking in 1997, then finally a 9 dan in 1998. He was the first professional player to achieve a 9 dan ranking while competing only in Taiwan . He is widely credited as the best player of the Taiwan Qiyuan, although with the increasing popularity of Go in his country, his status has been challenged by other opponents. He won his first international title, LG Cup, in 2007 beating Hu Yaoyu 2 to 1. He is the only player from Taiwan Qiyuan to win an international as of 2020.

He is nicknamed as the "red-faced go master" due to the presence of a large birth mark on his right face. In the west his name is often rendered as "Chun-Hsun Chou".

References

Titles & runners-up

1980 births
Living people
Taiwanese Go players
Sportspeople from Taipei
Go players at the 2010 Asian Games
Asian Games competitors for Chinese Taipei